Minor Michigan Infantry Units of the American Civil War

The State of Michigan raised a pair of company-sized infantry units for the American Civil War.

Stanton Guard, Michigan Volunteer Infantry

The Stanton Guard was organized at Detroit, Michigan in April 1862 by Captain Grover S. Wormer and mustered in on May 10, to serve as guards over General William G. Harding, Washington Barrow and Judge Joseph C. Guild, three Confederate sympathizers from Nashville, TN sent as prisoners to the fort on Mackinac Island. Upon the removal of the prisoners, it was mustered out of service on September 25, 1862. Capt Wormer afterward served as lieutenant colonel in the 8th Michigan Cavalry and colonel in the 30th Michigan Infantry.

Independent Company, Michigan Volunteer Infantry (Provost Guard)
The Independent Company was organized at Detroit, Michigan and mustered in on January 3, 1863.  The unit  served as Provost Guard at the Detroit Barracks until it was mustered out of service on May 9, 1865.

See also
List of Michigan Civil War Units
Michigan in the American Civil War

Notes

References
 
The Civil War Archive

.
Civil War, Minor
Michigan in the American Civil War